"Hometown Girl" is a song recorded by American country music artist Josh Turner.  It was released in May 2016 as the second single from his sixth studio album, Deep South.  The song was written by Marc Beeson and Daniel Tashian.

Music video
The music video was directed by Michael Monaco recorded in Live and acoustic and premiered on CMT, GAC & VEVO in 2017.

Critical reception
The song peaked at number 2 on the Billboard Country Airplay chart dated May 6, 2017, making it Turner's first top 10 single since "Time Is Love" in 2012.

Commercial performance
The song has sold 238,000 copies in the United States as of May 2017. It was certified Platinum on April 23, 2018 for a million units in sales and streams.

Chart performance

Year-end charts

Certifications

References

2016 songs
2016 singles
Josh Turner songs
MCA Nashville Records singles
Songs written by Marc Beeson
Songs written by Daniel Tashian